Aronowitz is a surname. Notable people with the surname include:

 Alfred "Al" Gilbert Aronowitz (1928–2005), American rock journalist
 Cecil Aronowitz (1916–1978), British violist
 Milton Aronowitz, an American college football head coach
 Robert Allan Aronowitz (born 1953), American physician
 Stanley Aronowitz (1933–2021), professor of sociology

Aronovitz 
 Abraham "Abe" Aronovitz (1899–1960), Jewish American lawyer and mayor
 Sidney Aronovitz (1920–1997), American lawyer and United States federal judge
 Sidney M. Aronovitz United States Courthouse

Aronowicz 
 Yitzhak "Ike" Aronowicz (1923–2009)
 Éclair Margaret Aronowicz, character in the musical Cohort B

See also 
 Aronovitz Business News
 Aaronovitch

References 

Slavic-language surnames
Jewish surnames